Terre Haute Transit Utility or Terre Haute City Bus provides public transportation in the city of Terre Haute, Vigo County, Indiana

Services

Transportation is provided Monday through Saturday on 6 day and 3 evening fixed route lines along with two campus routes. One through the Indiana State University campus and another connecting to the Ivy Tech Main Campus.
 The city began operating bus service in 1964.

Bus routes

Day
 East Wabash/East Locust
 Honey Creek Mall
 North 19th/12 Points
 Plaza North
 South 7th
 Southeast/Southside

Evening
 Northeast
 Honey Creek Mall
 South 7th

Campus
ISU Campus Route
Ivy Tech CampusTransit

Paratransit
Wheels to the World provides service to ADA qualified passengers during regular operating hours.

Fares and Passes

Fares

Regular: $1.75 - Children 5 & under ride free when accompanied by an adult. 
Reduced: $.75 - for Senior Citizens/Disabled/Medicare Card Holders (ID Required) from 9:15am – 3:15pm & 7:00pm – 11:00pm

Passes
14-Ride Pass: $18.00 is available from the driver or at the Transit Office.
31-Day Pass: $40.00 - Unlimited rides for 31 days from the activation date. Available at the Transit Office at the new Multi-Modal Parking Garage.

Campus Agreements
Indiana State University students, faculty and staff are able to ride the bus for free by showing their university ID. This is a result of a contract with the university where it pays the transit utility $110,000 per semester, which is matched with federal transit funds.
Ivy Tech students and staff have the choice to ride the Terre Haute City Bus as well as the CampusTransit Shuttle Bus at no charge by showing a valid Ivy Tech ID.

Fleet
Terre Haute transit uses a number of "Paratransit" vehicles manufactured by StarTrans. Fleet numbers range from 30-42 and a StarTrans Replica Trolley. Their fleet also includes two Azure Citibuses, hybrid type vehicles, that were entered service in May 2010.

References

External links
Terre Haute Transit
Terre Haute Economic Development Corp
West Central Indiana Metropolitan Planning Organization Transportation Planning

Bus transportation in Indiana
Terre Haute, Indiana
Transportation in Vigo County, Indiana